Bernardino Álvarez Herrera ( – ) was a Catholic friar in New Spain. 

He joined the army in his boyhood, but was dismissed for misconduct and transported to a penal colony in the Philippine islands. He escaped thence and went to Peru, where he amassed a large fortune, after the manner of the adventurers of the time. But, unlike most of them, he devoted this wealth to charitable objects. He founded the benevolent order of St. Bernardine, and in Mexico, Vera Cruz, Acapulco, and other cities of New Spain, established hospitals, which are served by an association named for St. Hippolite. His philanthropy made him famous among the people who have been benefited by his gifts.

Bernardino Álvarez died on 12 August 1584 in Mexico.

Created via preloaddraft
1514 births
1584 deaths
Mexican Roman Catholic clergy